This is a list of Members of Parliament (MPs) elected in the 1835 general election.

List

References

External links

See also 

 List of parliaments of the United Kingdom
 List of United Kingdom Parliament constituencies (1832–1868) by region

1835 United Kingdom general election
1835
UK MPs 1835–1837
1835-related lists